Erennidae is a family of cnidarians belonging to the order Siphonophorae.

Genera:
 Erenna Bedot, 1904
 Parerenna Pugh, 2001

References

 
Physonectae
Cnidarian families